Daniel Casey Dorn (born July 20, 1984) is an American former professional baseball right fielder and first baseman. He played in Major League Baseball (MLB) for the Arizona Diamondbacks and in KBO League for the Nexen Heroes.

Career

Amateur
Dorn played college baseball at California State University, Fullerton from 2003 to 2006. In 2005, he played collegiate summer baseball with the Brewster Whitecaps of the Cape Cod Baseball League. After his junior season, he was drafted by the Tampa Bay Devil Rays in the 23rd round of the 2005 Major League Baseball Draft. He did not sign and returned for his senior season.

Cincinnati Reds
He was drafted by the Cincinnati Reds in the 32nd round of the 2006 MLB Draft. Dorn played in the Reds organization from 2006 to 2012. He was released by the Reds in 2012.

Detroit Tigers
On December 14, 2012, Dorn signed a minor league deal with the Detroit Tigers.

Arizona Diamondbacks
On November 27, 2013, Dorn signed with the Arizona Diamondbacks. He was called up to the majors for the first time on April 21, 2015. On August 24, Dorn was designated for assignment.

Toronto Blue Jays
He was claimed off waivers by the Toronto Blue Jays on August 28, 2015, and assigned to the Triple-A Buffalo Bisons. He was designated for assignment on September 6, and assigned outright to Buffalo on September 9. On November 6, 2015, Dorn elected free agency.

Nexen Heroes
Dorn signed with the Nexen Heroes of the Korea Baseball Organization in November 2015. He became a free agent after the 2017 season.

Somerset Patriots
On March 19, 2018, Dorn signed with the Somerset Patriots of the Atlantic League of Professional Baseball. He became a free agent following the 2018 season.

Coaching career
In 2020, Dorn was announced as the manager for the Los Angeles Dodgers Dominican Summer League affiliate. In 2021, Dorn became the manager of the Arizona League Dodgers.

References

External links

Cal State Fullerton Titans bio

1984 births
Living people
People from San Dimas, California
Baseball coaches from California
Baseball players from California
Arizona Diamondbacks players
Kiwoom Heroes players
American expatriate baseball players in South Korea
Cal State Fullerton Titans baseball players
Billings Mustangs players
Sarasota Reds players
Chattanooga Lookouts players
Louisville Bats players
Caribes de Anzoátegui players
Leones del Caracas players
American expatriate baseball players in Venezuela
Toledo Mud Hens players
Arizona League Diamondbacks players
Reno Aces players
Buffalo Bisons (minor league) players
KBO League outfielders
Somerset Patriots players
Brewster Whitecaps players
Minor league baseball managers